Bigg Boss Halla Bol is the spin-off of the Indian reality television show Bigg Boss. It was a merger of Bigg Boss 8 similarly to the concept adopted by the Ultimate Big Brother. Five contestants from previous seasons enters the house to compete with five regular entrants of the season 8 finale. Farah Khan hosted the new format of the show, as Salman bid adieu to the show because of his filming schedule of Bajrangi Bhaijaan.

The series was won by Gautam Gulati.

The ratings held a record for an all-time low with the final only managing to score a TRP of 2.82 until Bigg Boss 15 finale aired grabbing a rating of only 1.9. The official tabulators for the show being Ernst & Young allegedly  had formed the final result based on a number of votes which was not only less than the previous seasons but also the evictions for the same series. An additional statement released by the firm revealed that the percentage separating the final two contenders was lower than one whole unit indicating figurative comparison to a photo finish.

Bigg Boss Halla Bol
In the fifteenth week Bigg Boss announced that show has been extended for four weeks and unlike previous seasons crowned its five champions on 3 January concluding season 8 finale, where spin-off Bigg Boss Halla Bol launched and merged with the regular season. The spin-off series officially launched on 4 January, with the five Halla Bol Challengers from previous seasons which includes Ajaz Khan, Sambhavna Seth, Mahek Chahal, Rahul Mahajan and Sana Khan. Sana's entrance was disclosed later as a fifth challenger by production team. Before the official announcement only Ajaz entered the house on Day 99. The new spin-off format of Champions and Challengers with ten contestants hosted by Farah Khan as contractually Salman bids adieu from the series concluding season finale. Confirming her participation Farah said:

Broadcast syndication

Housemates status 

Notes
 Continuation of Bigg Boss 8
Key
  indicates Champions.
  indicates Challengers.

Events overview

Housemates

Karishma Tanna is a television actress.
 Gautam Gulati is a television actor.
 Pritam Singh RJ is a radio jockey.
 Ali Quli Mirza is a singer
 Dimpy Ganguly is the winner of Season 2 of India's rendition of The Bachelor.

Five challengers returned, as veterans for the title, from previous seasons. While two housemates were chosen from Season 2 and one from Season 5, 6 and 7 each. No inclusions were made from Season 1, 3 and 4.
 Ajaz Khan is an actor who finished in third place in season seven.
 Mahek Chahal is an actress and model who was a runner-up in the fifth season.
 Rahul Mahajan is an actor and the son of politician Pramod Mahajan. He quit the show in the second season.
 Sambhavna Seth is an actress and dancer and has appeared in Bhojpuri films. In the second season, she finished in tenth place.
 Sana Khan is an actress, model and dancer who participated in season six, finishing in third place.

Guests

Contestant status

 Five contestants from previous seasons entered the house as the challengers against the five remaining finalists of Season 8.
 On the basis of their performance in the luxury budget task, Mahek was upgraded to the champion level while Gautam was downgraded to the challenger level. Both of them were selected by their respective teams as the best and worst performer respectively.
 On the basis of their performance in the luxury budget task, Sambhavna was upgraded to the champion level while Dimpy was downgraded to the challenger level. Sambhavna chose herself for the best performer while the captain, Karishma chose Dimpy as the worst performer.
 Challengers chose Tabadla as Luxury Budget over Food where Sana was upgraded as Champion and Karishma was downgraded as Challenger. Both of them were selected by Challengers.
 Challengers win the task given by Bigg Boss. As a result, the challengers were upgraded as champions team and the champions were made the challengers.
 Sambhavna gets eliminated from the house and the remaining housemates are declared as finalists.

Nominations table
 For previous details on the voting history, prior to the 'Halla Bol!' merger, see; Bigg Boss 8#Voting history from week 1 to week 15. 

  indicates that the Housemate was directly nominated for eviction prior to the regular nominations process.
  indicates that the Housemate was granted immunity from nominations.

: Ajaz entered the house before Season 8 finale on Day 99, but credited as a Halla Bol Challenger, his presence for seven days didn't affect any change.
: On Day 1, Housemates nominated face to face, with each Housemate nominating three people as opposed to the usual two. Following Ajaz's ejection, the eviction scheduled to take place on Day 7 was cancelled.
: Housemates with the 'Challenger' status were not eligible to vote. Housemates with the 'Champion' status were immune from nominations and held the right to vote.
: Mehek was nominated by Sana via her "Bigg Bomb" after her eviction.
: Pritam was given immunity from nominations for winning the luxury task. Karishma was given a special power to directly nominate a contestant for eviction, which she had earned by voluntarily walking out of the luxury budget task in order to get this power. She chose Ali.
: All contestants were asked to give two names for nominations but from the opposite team only.
: All 5 finalists were automatically placed in the nominations.

References

External links

Bigg Boss (Hindi TV series)
Colors TV original programming
2015 Indian television seasons